Sympistis atricollaris is a species of moth in the family Noctuidae (the owlet moths).

The MONA or Hodges number for Sympistis atricollaris is 10128.

References

Further reading

 
 
 

atricollaris
Articles created by Qbugbot
Moths described in 1875